Spinster is a term referring to an unmarried woman who is older than what is perceived as the prime age range during which women usually marry. It can also indicate that a woman is considered unlikely to ever marry. The term originally denoted a woman whose occupation was to spin. A synonymous term is old maid. The closest equivalent term for males is "bachelor" or "confirmed bachelor", but this generally does not carry the same connotations in reference to age and perceived desirability in marriage.

Etymology and history

 
Long before the Industrial Age, "the art & calling of being a spinster" denoted girls and women who spun wool. According to the Online Etymological Dictionary, spinning was "commonly done by unmarried women, hence the word came to denote" an unmarried woman in legal documents from the 1600s to the early 1900s, and "by 1719 was being used generically for 'woman still unmarried and beyond the usual age for it'". As a denotation for unmarried women in a legal context, the term dates back to at least 1699, and was commonly used in banns of marriage of the Church of England where the prospective bride was described as a "spinster of this parish".

The Oxford American Dictionary tags "spinster" (meaning "...unmarried woman, typically an older woman beyond the usual age for marriage") as "derogatory" and "a good example of the way in which a word acquires strong connotations to the extent that it can no longer be used in a neutral sense."

The 1828 and 1913 editions of Merriam Webster's Dictionary defined spinster in two ways:

By the 1800s, the term had evolved to include women who chose not to marry. During that century middle-class spinsters, as well as their married peers, took ideals of love and marriage very seriously, and spinsterhood was indeed often a consequence of their adherence to those ideals. They remained unmarried not because of individual shortcomings but because they didn't find the one "who could be all things to the heart".

One 19th-century editorial in the fashion publication Peterson's Magazine encouraged women to remain choosy in selecting a mate — even at the price of never marrying. The editorial, titled "Honorable Often to Be an Old Maid", advised women: "Marry for a home! Marry to escape the ridicule of being called an old maid? How dare you, then, pervert the most sacred institution of the Almighty, by becoming the wife of a man for whom you can feel no emotions of love, or respect even?"

Current use

The Oxford American English Dictionary defines spinster as "an unmarried woman, typically an older woman beyond the usual age for marriage". It adds: "In modern everyday English, however, spinster cannot be used to mean simply 'unmarried woman'; as such, it is a derogatory term, referring or alluding to a stereotype of an older woman who is unmarried, childless, prissy, and repressed."

Currently, Merriam-Webster's Dictionary defines the "unmarried woman" sense of the term in three ways: (1) an archaic usage meaning "an unmarried woman of gentle family", (2) a meaning related to (1) but not tagged as archaic: "an unmarried woman and especially one past the common age for marrying" and (3) "a woman who seems unlikely to marry".

Dictionary.com describes the "woman still unmarried beyond the usual age of marrying" sense of the term as "Disparaging and Offensive". A usage note goes on to say that this sense "is ... perceived as insulting. It implies negative qualities such as being fussy or undesirable". Also included is a sense of the word used specifically in a legal context: "a woman who has never married".

Wordreference.com describes the "woman still unmarried" sense of spinster as "dated".

Age is a crucial part of the definition, according to Robin Lakoff's explanation in Language and Woman's Place: "If someone is a spinster, by implication she is not eligible [to marry]; she has had her chance, and been passed by. Hence, a girl of twenty cannot be properly called a spinster: she still has a chance to be married". Yet other sources on terms describing a never-married woman indicate that the term applies to a woman as soon as she is of legal age or age of majority (see bachelorette, single).

The title "spinster" has been embraced by feminists like Sheila Jeffreys, whose book The Spinster and Her Enemies (1985) defines spinsters simply as women who have chosen to reject sexual relationships with men. In her 2015 book, Spinster, Making a Life of One's Own, Kate Bolick has written, "To me, the spinster is self-reliant and inscrutable. We think we know what the wife is up to and what the mother is up to but the single woman is mysterious. I like that mystery. So the term is a useful way to hold onto the idea of autonomy that can get so easily lost inside of marriage or motherhood".

In 2005, in England and Wales, the term was abolished in favour of "single" for the purpose of marriage registration. However, it is still often used when the banns of marriage are read by Church of England parish churches.

Research
A 2009 University of Missouri study of 32 women found that modern "spinsters" feel a social stigma attached to their status and a sense of both heightened visibility and invisibility. "Heightened visibility came from feelings of exposure and invisibility came from assumptions made by others".

Women and marriage
Women may not have married for a variety (and/or combination) of reasons, including personal inclination, a dearth of eligible men (whose numbers can decrease dramatically during war conflicts), and socio-economic conditions (that is, the availability of livelihoods for women). Writer and spinster Louisa May Alcott famously wrote that "liberty is a better husband than love to many of us". Social status issues could also arise where it was unacceptable for a woman to marry below her social rank but her parents lacked the funds to support a marriage within their social rank.

In the early 19th century, particularly in England, women would fall under coverture, stating that all property and contracts in their name would be ceded to their husbands. This was particularly common in women who owned businesses.

The First World War (1914–1918) prevented many within a generation of women from experiencing heterosexual romance and marriage or having children.

In modern peacetime societies with wide opportunities for romance, marriage and children, there are other reasons that women remain single as they approach old age. Psychologist Erik Erikson postulated that during young adulthood (ages 18 to 39), individuals experience an inner conflict between a desire for intimacy (i.e., a committed relationship leading to marriage) and a desire for isolation (i.e., fear of commitment). Other reasons women may choose not to marry include a focus on career, a desire for an independent life, economic considerations, or an unwillingness to make the compromises expected in a marriage.

Some writers have suggested that to understand why women do not marry, one should examine reasons women do marry and why it may be assumed they should marry in the first place. According to Adrienne Rich, "Women have married because it was necessary, in order to economically, in order to have children who would not suffer economic deprivation or social ostracism, in order to remain respectable, in order to do what was expected of women because coming out of 'abnormal' childhoods they wanted to feel 'normal', and because heterosexual romance has been represented as the great female adventure, duty, and fulfillment".

Around the world
Never-married women are called "aanissat" in Arabic, "spinsters" or "old maids" in English, "vieilles filles" in French, "zitelle" in Italian, "alte Jungfer" in German, "shengnu" in Mandarin, "stara panna" in Polish and "dakhtar torsheedeh" in Persian. In Japan, where women had traditionally been expected to marry at a young age, those who were unmarried after the age of 25 were metaphorically referred to as (unsold) Christmas cakes (クリスマスケーキ) in reference to items which are still unsold after the 25th.

Events today
In Australia, parties are held for young single people to meet and socialize (particularly in the rural areas). These events are known as Bachelor and Spinster Balls or colloquially "B and S Balls". A philanthropic group of women between the ages of 21 and 35, called the Spinsters of San Francisco, organizes events.

Media
By the 2010s, interest developed in this word as a form of reappropriation from third-wave feminists. Examples include blogs and videos, such as "Reclaiming the Pejorative", including a Bitch Magazine article and the Spinster House YouTube channel.

Film
Many classic and modern films have depicted stereotypical spinster characters. For example:

In the classic Now, Voyager (1942), Bette Davis portrayed Charlotte Vale, a conventionally unattractive, overweight, repressed spinster whose life is dominated by her dictatorial mother, an aristocratic Boston dowager whose verbal and emotional abuse of her daughter has contributed to the woman's complete lack of self-confidence. 
Bette Davis played a spinster named Charlotte in Hush... Hush, Sweet Charlotte (1964). 
Katharine Hepburn specialized in playing spinsters in the 1950s, such as Rosie in The African Queen (1951), Jane Hudson in Summertime (1955), and Lizzie in The Rainmaker (1956). 
The fictional character Bridget Jones often refers to herself as a spinster in the film Bridget Jones's Diary (2001). 
The documentary Cat Ladies (2009) involves four spinsters whose lives have become dedicated to their cats.
Maureen O'Hara played Mary Kate Danaher in The Quiet Man (1952).
In The Great Train Robbery (1978), Edward Pierce's (Sean Connery) courting of Edgar Trent's plain spinster daughter Elizabeth (Gabrielle Lloyd) is a plot point regarding Pierce's acquisition of the first of four keys needed for the heist.
In It's a Wonderful Life (1946), George Bailey sees the consequences of a world in which he never existed, one of which is that his wife Mary would have become an "old maid" librarian. The film presents this as a tragic outcome, but modern viewers have noted that the spinster version of Mary—portrayed as independent, gainfully employed, & surrounded by books—is hardly living an unfulfilling life.

Literature
In both The Taming of the Shrew (early 1590s) and Much Ado About Nothing (late 1590s), William Shakespeare referred to a contemporary saying that it was the fate of women who died unmarried to lead apes into hell.

The word thornbacks was used to refer to old maids in Peter Anthony Motteux's 1694 English translation of François Rabelais' 16th century novels Gargantua and Pantagruel. In one of the earliest examples of autobiographical writing in English, John Dunton wrote in 1705 that unmarried women in Boston were called thornbacks at the age of thirty. A thornback (Raja clavata) is a commonly eaten species of ray fish, the female young of which were called maids, and in Scotland maiden-skates.

The books Washington Square and The Heiress have old maid heroines who ultimately choose to remain spinsters and embrace the freedom of not having to enter marriage.

One stereotype of spinsters that appears in literature is that they are downtrodden or spineless women who were victims of an oppressive parent. This stereotype is played out in William Faulkner's classic short story "A Rose for Emily" (1930), in which Emily's father is confident that no man is worthy of his daughter's hand in marriage.

Other stereotypes include women who were relegated to lifetime roles as family caretaker for their family of origin or for a married sibling's children, "poor relations" who would work "to earn their keep" as nannies or unpaid domestics. For example, being a governess was the fate expected by the rejected titular orphan in Charlotte Brontë's novel Jane Eyre (1847); Eyre retained that status until the man she loved was widowed and available.

A common theme in the fiction writings of author/poet Sandra Cisneros is marital disillusionment; for example. in the poem "Old Maids" (1994).

In the Charles Dickens' classic Great Expectations, the primary antagonist is Miss Havisham, a spinster embittered by being defrauded and abandoned on her wedding day; an event that shaped the rest of her life, and by extension, those around her.

Another stereotype of the spinster that has appeared in literature is the quick-witted and sometimes quick-tempered independent woman, who has remained unmarried by choice, as in "Spinster Thurber's Carpet" (1897), Pauline Phelps's popular short story and play about an unmarried woman who decides during the Revolutionary War that she'd rather have a carpet than a husband.

The popular and shrewdly intelligent detective Miss Marple was a spinster heroine in Agatha Christie's series of crime novels, which later became a television series. Similarly, Miss Climpson in Dorothy L. Sayers Lord Peter Wimsey novels is portrayed as an intelligent, competent person who serves as a valuable assistant to Lord Peter, as she can go places and ask questions that he can't.

In Jane Austen's Emma, the character Miss Bates is a spinster and Austen (who never married) gives her stereotypical negative characteristics such as garrulousness.

In Salman Rushdie's Midnight's Children, Alia Sinai becomes a spinster after the man she was engaged to marry elopes with her sister. Alia's characterization at times resembles the proud, feminist conception of a spinster: she becomes a successful professional and a courageous pro-democracy political activist. Other aspects of Alia's characterization, however, align with the more traditional, misogynistic conception of spinsterhood: she is portrayed as ugly, bitter, vengeful, and, at least as concerns her family, destructive.

Music
The Kingston Trio's "Take Her Out of Pity", included on their 1961 album Close-Up, is based on the traditional American folk song, "The Old Maid's Song".

Bob Dylan's song "The Lonesome Death of Hattie Carroll" (1963) tells the true story of a murder at a spinsters' ball in Baltimore in 1963.

Paul McCartney, while in the Beatles, composed the hit song "Eleanor Rigby" (1966) about the loneliness and death of a spinster (though he never used the term in the lyrics).

The country song "Delta Dawn", made famous by Tanya Tucker, overviews the plight of a woman focused on a single lost love, destined to go unmarried unless the lover returns.

See also
Cat lady
Catherinette
Hikikomori
Medieval singlewomen
She never married
Sheng nu

References

External links

 
Goodbye to the Spinster by Wendy Braitman
Barbie: Always a Bridesmaid, Never a Bride by Wendy Braitman

Age-related stereotypes
English words
Interpersonal relationships
Non-sexuality
Pejorative terms for women
Stereotypes of women